Halgyrineum is a genus of predatory sea snails, marine gastropod mollusks in the family Cymatiidae.

Species
Species within the genus Halgyrineum include:

 Halgyrineum louisae (Lewis, 1974)

References

Cymatiidae
Monotypic gastropod genera